Tanzania competed at the 1992 Summer Paralympics in Barcelona, Spain from September 3 to September 14, 1992.

Team 
Tanzania sent one sportsperson to the Barcelona Games, table tennis player Noorel Sharriff.

Table tennis 
Sharriff competed in the Men's Open 6-10 event. He lost to Spain's Javier Mosteirin 0 - 2 and was eliminated from the Games.

See also

 Tanzania at the 1992 Summer Olympics

References

Nations at the 1992 Summer Paralympics
1992
1992 in Tanzanian sport